Alor Gajah is a federal constituency in Alor Gajah District and Jasin District, Malacca, Malaysia, that has been represented in the Dewan Rakyat since 1974.

The federal constituency was created in the 1974 redistribution and is mandated to return a single member to the Dewan Rakyat under the first past the post voting system.

Demographics

History

Polling districts
According to the gazette issued on 31 October 2022, the Alor Gajah constituency has a total of 41 polling districts.

Representation history

Note: 1Noted that in 2004 redelineation exercise this Alor Gajah constituency is now shifted east to Alor Gajah city centre from former Selandar constituency, not Masjid Tanah which now renamed as Masjid Tanah.

State constituency

Current state assembly members

Local governments

Election results

References

Malacca federal constituencies